The Skalkaho Pass (Salish: Sq̓x̣q̓x̣ó, "many trails" ),  above sea level, is a pass in the Sapphire Mountains in southwest Montana traversed by Montana Highway 38.

The road over the pass connects the towns of Hamilton in the Bitterroot Valley and Philipsburg in Flint Creek Valley and remains the only direct route between these two important agricultural areas. Originally an Indian route, Highway 38 was built in 1924 to link mountainous mining areas with the agricultural settlements in the valleys.  The route is closed during winter due to heavy snowfall.

Skalkaho Falls is near the top of the pass.

See also
 Mountain passes in Montana

References

External links 

 Going over Skalkaho Pass ... Anaconda to Hamilton, Montana, YouTube

Mountain passes of Montana
Landforms of Ravalli County, Montana